is an action video game developed by FuzzBox, published by Square and released in 1999 for the PlayStation.

A majority of the game is in English.

Gameplay
Classified as a Space Opera, a new type of action game, Cyber Org is set in a futuristic world, with three different playable characters and multiple areas to explore. Each area has puzzles and fight sequences rendered in polygonal 3D. The gameplay is easy to understand even for beginners, utilizing a single button combined with a secondary button for combo attacks.

Audio

The music of Cyber Org was composed by Yoshihiro Sato.

Development
The game was announced in December 1998

References

External links
Cyber Org at Square Enix

1999 video games
Action video games
PlayStation (console) games
PlayStation (console)-only games
Square (video game company) games
Video games developed in Japan